Mordellistenochroa fallaciosa is a beetle in the genus Mordellistenochroa of the family Mordellidae. It was described in 1969 by Ermisch.

References

Mordellidae
Beetles described in 1969